Ulu Peninsula is that portion of James Ross Island northwest of the narrow neck of land between Rohss Bay and Croft Bay, extending from Cape Obelisk to Cape Lachman. Named descriptively by the United Kingdom Antarctic Place-Names Committee (UK-APC) in 1987. In plan view the cove is shaped like an ulu, a type of knife traditionally used by Inuit women.

Peninsulas of Graham Land
Landforms of James Ross Island